Plateau Central Senatorial District  in Plateau State covers five local government areas which consists  Bokkos, Mangu, Pankshin, Kanke and Kanam.  The headquarters (collation centre) of this senate district is Panskhin. Plateau Central is currently represented in the Senate by Hezekiah Dimka of the All Progressives Congress, APC.

Musician, producer, blogger and social media influencer Makut Alfred Mashat hails from Bokkos local Government in Plateau central senatorial district.

List of senators representing Plateau Central

References 

Plateau State
Senatorial districts in Nigeria